Segodnya Multimedia Publishing Group

History 

Private joint stock company Segodnya Multimedia (“Publishing group “Segodnya” JSC till 2007) has been working in publishing business since 1997. In 2007 Web portal Segodnya.ua was launched. Segodnya Publishing Group is a member of UAPP. Starting from August, 2006 the Holding is headed by CEO, Editor-in-Chief Guillermo Schmitt.

In 2022, after Ukrainian oligarch Rinat Akhmetov had exited his media assets, the company folded.

Products 
Main products of Segodnya Multimedia PrJSC are:
 Newspaper Segodnya
 Web portal Segodnya.ua
 Printing plant in Vyshhorod
 Rio Weekly
 Media-Press JSC
 Donetskie Novosti LLC
 Priazovskiy Rabochiy
 Vecherniy Donetsk
 gorod.dp.ua

Ownership 

The major owners of Segodnya Multimedia PrJSC are:
- SCM Limited (Cyprus)
- System Capital Management SC
- Media Group Ukraine

References

External links 
 Segodnya Multimedia official website
 Segodnya.ua

SCM Holdings
Mass media in Ukraine
2022 disestablishments in Ukraine
Publishing companies disestablished in 2022
Publishing companies of Ukraine